Sheshtaraz may refer to:
 Sheshtaraz District
 Sheshtaraz Rural District